Jana Novotná and Helena Suková were the defending champions.

The tournament was completely cancelled due to inclement weather. Only 4 first-round matches were completed.

Seeds
The top four seeds received a bye to the second round.

Draw

Finals

Top half

Bottom half

References

External links
 Official results archive (ITF)
 Official results archive (WTA)

1991 WTA Tour
Virginia Slims of Palm Springs - Doubles